William Cronin (December 5, 1901 – March 16, 1956) was an American football fullback who played three seasons with the Providence Steam Roller of the National Football League (NFL). He played college football at Boston College and attended Hingham High School in Hingham, Massachusetts. He was also a member of the Boston Bulldogs of the American Football League (AFL).

Early years
Cronin played high school football for the Hingham High School Harbormen. He started the Harbormen hockey team in the early 1940s. He was inducted into the Hingham High School Athletic Hall of Fame in 1999.

College career
Cronin played college football for the Boston College Eagles.

Professional career
Cronin played for the Boston Bulldogs of the AFL in 1926. He played for the Providence Steam Roller of the NFL from 1927 to 1929.

Personal life
Cronin's brother Jack also played football.

References

External links
Just Sports Stats

1901 births
1956 deaths
Players of American football from Massachusetts
American football fullbacks
Boston College Eagles football players
Boston Bulldogs (AFL) players
Providence Steam Roller players
People from Hingham, Massachusetts
Sportspeople from Plymouth County, Massachusetts